Events from the year 1776 in Scotland.

Incumbents

Law officers 
 Lord Advocate – Henry Dundas; 
 Solicitor General for Scotland – Alexander Murray

Judiciary 
 Lord President of the Court of Session – Lord Arniston, the younger
 Lord Justice General – Duke of Queensberry
 Lord Justice Clerk – Lord Barskimming

Events 
 27 February – American Revolution: At the Battle of Moore's Creek Bridge, Scottish American Loyalists are defeated by North Carolina Patriots. Capt. Allan MacDonald (husband of Flora) is among those taken prisoner.
 4 July – American Revolution: United States Declaration of Independence. Fife-born James Wilson and Gifford-born Rev. John Witherspoon are among the signatories.
 Physician Andrew Duncan proposes establishment of the institution that becomes the Royal Public Dispensary of Edinburgh.
 New Aray Bridge on Inveraray Castle estate, designed by Robert Mylne, is completed.
 Probable – Dunmore Pineapple constructed.

Publications 
 9 March – Adam Smith's The Wealth of Nations is published in London.
 David Dalrymple's Annals of Scotland are published.

The arts
 David Herd's anthology Ancient and Modern Scottish Songs is published.

Births 
 23 February – Heneage Horsley, Episcopal dean (died 1847)
 9 March – Archibald Bell, lawyer and writer (died 1854)
 11 April – Macvey Napier, lawyer and encyclopedia editor (died 1847)
 15 April – John Anstruther, nobleman, landowner and colonel (died 1833)
 11 June – James Gillespie Graham, architect (died 1855)
 18 July – John Struthers, poet (died 1853)
 6 October – James Duff, 4th Earl Fife, general in Spanish service (died 1857)
 13 October – John Gibb, civil engineering contractor (died 1850)
 7 November – James Abercromby, 1st Baron Dunfermline, lawyer and Whig politician (died 1858)
 20 November – William Blackwood, publisher (died 1834)
 30 November – James Jardine, hydraulic engineer (died 1858)

Deaths 
 2 June – Robert Foulis, printer, publisher and art critic (born 1707)
 25 August – David Hume, philosopher (born 1711)

References 

 
Years of the 18th century in Scotland
Scotland
1770s in Scotland